Ringos Desert is the second studio album by American electronic music producer Zhu, released on September 7, 2018 via Mind of a Genius label. The album features works and vocals from the likes of Tokimonsta, Majid Jordan, and Tame Impala. The album followed the success of ZHU's collaborative debut studio album Generationwhy, released in 2016.

Critical reception
Upon release, Ringos Desert received favorable reviews. Dancing Astronaut praised Ringos Desert saying that "Every song is polished to absolute perfection, each sound given dedicated space to exist like modern art in an exhibit. Tucked into the songs is a cheeky dose of western sonic flavor that seasons the entire album". Billboard magazine characterized songs on the album as having "a right clubbiness", "a ghostly R&B touch", and a "romantic struggle narrative with a strong sentiment of self-empowerment".

Commercial performance
The album debuted at number 15 on the Billboard Top Dance/Electronic Albums. The single "My Life (feat. Tame Impala)" peaked at No. 20 on the US Dance charts.

Track listing
All tracks produced by Zhu, except for "Still Want U", produced alongside Karnaval Blues, and "Coming Home", produced alongside Jordan Ullman.

Charts

References

2018 albums
Zhu (musician) albums